Sungezhuang Manchu Ethnic Township is a township-level division in Jizhou District, Tianjin, China.

References

Township-level divisions of Tianjin
Ethnic townships of the People's Republic of China